The Premio Omenoni is a Listed flat horse race in Italy open to thoroughbreds aged three years or older. It is run at Milan over a distance of 1,000 metres (about 5 furlongs), and it is scheduled to take place each year in October. It was formerly contested at Group 3 level before being downgraded in 2016.

Records
Most successful horse since 1986 (2 wins):
 Arranvanna – 1992, 1993
 Leap for Joy – 1995, 1996

Leading jockey since 1986 (3 wins):

 Fabio Branca - Dagda Mor (2011), Harlem Shake (2014), Intense Life (2016)

Leading trainer since 1986 (4 wins):
 Armando Renzoni – Arranvanna (1992, 1993), Armando Carpio (1997), Le Cadre Noir (2007)

Winners since 1986

 The 2008 running was cancelled because of a strike.

See also
 List of Italian flat horse races

References

 Racing Post:

 galopp-sieger.de – Premio Omenoni.
 horseracingintfed.com – International Federation of Horseracing Authorities – Premio Omenoni (2015).
 pedigreequery.com – Premio Omenoni – Milano San Siro.

Horse races in Italy
Open sprint category horse races
Sport in Milan